Tazeh Kand-e Qadim (also Romanized as Tāzeh Kand-e Qadīm; also known as Tāzeh Kand) is a city in Tazeh Kand District of Parsabad County, Ardabil province, Iran. At the 2006 census, its population was 2,802 in 574 households, when it was a village in Tazeh Kand Rural District. The following census in 2011 counted 2,798 people in 716 households, by which time the village had been elevated to the status of a city. The latest census in 2016 showed a population of 2,575 people in 708 households.

References 

Parsabad County

Cities in Ardabil Province

Towns and villages in Parsabad County

Populated places in Ardabil Province

Populated places in Parsabad County